The Tonight Show Band was the house band that played on the American television variety show The Tonight Show. From 1962 until 1992, when the show was known as The Tonight Show Starring Johnny Carson, the band was a 17-piece big band, and was an important showcase for jazz on American television. During the Carson era, the band was always billed as "The NBC Orchestra" (not to be confused with the NBC Symphony Orchestra) and sometimes "Doc Severinsen and the NBC Orchestra".

History
Just as Tonight! Starring Steve Allen was a continuation of the local New York Steve Allen Show (which had gone on the air in late July 1953), the first Tonight Show Band was an expansion of the small band on the Allen show that had been led by swing era trombonist Bobby Byrne (and, significantly, included trumpeter Doc Severinsen). But when the program went onto the NBC network, September 27, 1954, pianist Skitch Henderson was brought in as leader of a still-smallish ensemble band including Severinsen (who played the program's closing theme, a melody of Allen's entitled "Tonight"; he played that solo not once but three times every night to accommodate the various affiliate stations that left the broadcast at different times: midnight, 12:30, and 1:00 AM Eastern time.) The opening theme also was written by Allen, "Mister Moon". The band also included, among others, trombonist Lou McGarity and two french horns (Henderson's fondness for french horns can be gleaned from the fact that when Allen added a Sunday night prime-time series on NBC in June 1956, the orchestra included four French horns). The band functioned mostly as a backdrop for Allen's vocalists from the local New York show, Steve Lawrence and Eydie Gorme. When the program went network, female vocalists Pat Marshall and Pat Kirby were added, along with Andy Williams. Usually two of the singers would appear on each program. Tonight's producer, William O. Harbach had worked with Williams in the late 1940s when he was part of a nightclub act centered around Kay Thompson. Tonight! thus was the first national exposure for Williams, Lawrence, and Gorme. Though Henderson would continue as Allen's conductor on the prime-time show through 1959, the Henderson-led Tonight! band ended when Steve Allen stepped down as host at the end of January 1957. During the Tonight! America After Dark period from February through June 1957, a string of short-lived bandleaders (Lou Stein, Mort Lindsey and Johnny Guarnieri) led either a trio or quartet of musicians as the show's house band.

José Melis, a friend of Jack Paar, took over as bandleader when Paar became the host later in 1957. Melis made The Tonight Show Band part of the show's comic ensemble, utilizing his improvisational comedy skills: in the "Telephone Game," he would write songs on the spot about four-digit telephone numbers given to him by audience members, while "Stump the Band" would have him improvise songs with titles given by audience members (these would usually be names of real, but obscure, novelty songs that Melis did not recognize). "Stump the Band" would remain a staple of Tonight and other late-night shows (including the Late Show) long after Melis's departure.

Henderson returned in 1962 with a 16-piece band—which on occasion would be expanded with additional personnel such as string players (for backing such singers as Eydie Gorme) and extra percussionists—as Johnny Carson took over from Paar. Carson increased the band's budget, and many of the players were veterans of the prime-time Steve Allen Show band, such as Severinsen. Other notable members of the trumpet section included Clark Terry, Bernie Glow, Yank Lawson, and Jimmy Maxwell, along with saxophonists Hymie Shertzer, Walt Levinsky, and Al Klink. Saxophonist-arranger Tommy Newsom joined the band in the second year. Legendary swing era bassist Bob Haggart often anchored the rhythm section and Gene Bertoncini alternated on guitar with Bucky Pizzarelli. The drum chair tended to alternate between Bobby Rosengarden and Ed Shaughnessy, who along with Newsom, trumpeter Snooky Young, pianist Ross Tompkins and baritone sax player Don Ashworth moved to California with the program in 1972. After Rosengarden left the band to become the conductor on ABC's Dick Cavett Show, Grady Tate became a frequent presence in the drum chair.

In 1966, Henderson (and Severinsen) left the show as the conductor from the original NBC late-night show from 1951, Broadway Open House, Milton Delugg came in for one year. In 1967 Severinsen returned, this time as conductor, and with basically the same personnel nonetheless inaugurated a somewhat more aggressive sound (using, for example, an electric bass, and a brassier version of the "Here's Johnny" theme). In Burbank, for Carson's last two decades as host, the Severinsen-led band included the core that had moved from New York along with such noted jazz players as saxophonists Ernie Watts, Pete Christlieb, and Bill Perkins; trumpeters Conte Candoli and John Audino; guitarist Bob Bain, and bassist Joel Di Bartolo. Occasionally, renowned drummer Louie Bellson would sit in for Shaughnessy.  When Jay Leno replaced Carson in 1992, he ended the tradition of a large in-house orchestra. Branford Marsalis became musical director, and a smaller band was formed. Marsalis was succeeded in 1995 by Kevin Eubanks.

In June 2009, Conan O'Brien became the host, and  Max Weinberg replaced Kevin Eubanks as bandleader, with the house band from Late Night with Conan O'Brien forming Max Weinberg and The Tonight Show Band. Eubanks and his band migrated to The Jay Leno Show in September 2009 as the Primetime Band. When Conan O'Brien left The Tonight Show in January 2010, Leno returned as host, bringing back Kevin Eubanks, who took a more limited role. Eubanks announced his departure from the show in February 2010; his last show was May 28, 2010.

On June 7, 2010, Rickey Minor became the bandleader and wrote the theme song.

When Jimmy Fallon became the host in 2014, the show returned to New York City and The Roots became the house band, migrating from their role as house band on Late Night with Jimmy Fallon. The Roots added two horn players from Sharon Jones & The Dap-Kings; bandleader Questlove noted, "You can't be The Tonight Show without a horn section".

Tonight Show Band lineups
Additional former members of the New York Tonight Show Band from 1962 onward include:

 Bass: Eddie Safranski, Bob Haggart, Julie Ruggiero, Bill Takis, 
 Drums: Grady Tate, Bobby Rosengarden
 Guitar: Bucky Pizzarelli, Gene Bertoncini
 Piano: Derek Smith
 Saxophone: Al Howard, Al Klink, Arnie Lawrence, Bobby Tricarico, Deane Kincaide, Don Raffell, Harold Feldman, Hymie Schertzer, Lew Tabackin, Paul Ricci, Sid Cooper, Buzz Brauner, Wally Kane, Walt Levinsky
 Trombone: Bob Alexander, Buddy Morrow, Dick Lieb, Herb Wise, Paul Faulise, Sonny Russo, Sy Berger, Will Bradley, Willie Dennis
 Trumpet: Bernie Glow, Bob McCoy, Carl Poole, Clark Terry, Dick Perry, Jimmy Maxwell, Joe Ferrante, John Frosk, Mel Davis, Snooky Young, Yank Lawson

With Johnny Carson
 Bandleader: Skitch Henderson, Milton Delugg, Doc Severinsen, Tommy Newsom 
 Flute, Clarinet and Saxophone: Bill Perkins, Ernie Watts, John Bambridge, Pete Christlieb, Tom Peterson, Tommy Newsom, Donald Ashworth, Lew Tabackin, Dick Spencer
 Trumpet and Flugelhorn: Allen Vizzutti, Chuck Findley, Conte Candoli, Doc Severinsen, Frank Szabo, John Audino, Maury Harris, Oscar Brashear, Pete Candoli, Snooky Young, Clark Terry
 Trombone: Bruce Paulson, Ernie Tack, Gil Falco, Mike Daigeau, Hal Crook
 Piano: Ross Tompkins, Russ Freeman
 Guitar: Bob Bain, Bucky Pizzarelli, Herb Ellis, Mitch Holder, Peter Woodford, Tony Mottola
 Bass: Joel DiBartolo, John B. Williams, John/Jennifer Leitham
 Drums: Ed Shaughnessy, Jack Sperling, Louie Bellson, Shelly Manne, Colin Bailey

With Jay Leno

 Bandleader: Branford Marsalis, Kevin Eubanks 
 Bass: Derrick Murdock, Stanley Sargeant, Bob Hurst, Kenny Davis
 Drums: Marvin Smith, Jeff "Tain" Watts
 Guitar: Kevin Eubanks
 Keyboard: Gerry Etkins, Kenny Kirkland
 Percussion/Vocals: Vicki Randle
 Saxophone: Branford Marsalis, Ralph Moore
 Trombone: Matt Finders
 Trumpet: Sal Marquez, Chuck Findley, Lee Thornburg, Kye Palmer

With Conan O'Brien

 Bandleader: Max Weinberg, Jimmy Vivino
 Bass: Mike Merritt
 Clarinet: Jerry Vivino
 Drums: Max Weinberg, James Wormworth
 Flute: Jerry Vivino
 Guitar: Jimmy Vivino, Mark Pender
 Keyboards: Scott Healy
 Percussion: James Wormworth, Ronnie Gutierrez
 Saxophone: Jerry Vivino
 Trombone: Richie "La Bamba" Rosenberg
 Trumpet: Mark Pender
 Vocals: Mark Pender

With Jay Leno (second tenure)

 Bandleader: Rickey Minor
 Bass: Rickey Minor
 Drums: Teddy Campbell
 Guitar: Paul Jackson Jr.
 Keyboard: J. Wayne Linsey, David Delhomme
 Percussion: Kevin Ricard
 Saxophone: Randolph Ellis, Miguel Gandelman
 Trombone: Garrett Smith
 Trumpet: Raymond Monteiro
 Vocals: Dorian Holley

With Jimmy Fallon 

 Bandleader: Questlove
 Bass: Mark Kelley
 Drums: Questlove
 Flute: Ian Hendrickson-Smith
 Guitar: Captain Kirk Douglas
 Keyboards: James Poyser, Kamal Gray
 Percussion: Stro Elliot
 Saxophone: Ian Hendrickson-Smith
 Sousaphone: Damon "Tuba Gooding Jr." Bryson
 Trumpet: David Guy
 Vocals: Black Thought

Discography
With Skitch Henderson and "The Tonight Show" Band
 Skitch...Tonight! (Columbia, 1964)
 More Skitch Tonight! (Columbia, 1965)
With Doc Severinsen and "The Tonight Show" Band
 The Tonight Show Band (Amherst, 1986)
 The Tonight Show Band Vol. II (Amherst, 1987)

References

American jazz ensembles
 
Big bands
Radio and television house bands